KREA (1540 kHz) is a commercial AM radio station in Honolulu, Hawaii.  It is owned by JMK Communications and airs a Korean radio format, billing itself on-air as "Hawaii Radio Seoul".

KREA is powered at 5,000 watts, using a non-directional antenna.  The transmitter is on Kalani Street in Honolulu, near the Kapalama Canal.

History
It was originally a daytimer station, required to go off the air at night because 1540 AM is a clear channel frequency. The call sign was KISA and it offered a Filipino format. It was owned by Manayan Enterprises.

It changed its call letters to KREA in 2000, beginning its Korean format.

References

External links
FCC History Cards for KREA

Asian-American culture in Honolulu
Korean-language radio stations in the United States
Korean-American culture in Hawaii
REA
REA
Radio stations established in 1973
1973 establishments in Hawaii